The Counties Manukau rugby league team represents the Counties Manukau zone in the Albert Baskerville Trophy. Previously, teams representing Southern Auckland and the Franklin district of New Zealand have competed in the Lion Red Cup and Bartercard Cup. They are nicknamed the Stingrays.

1994–1996: Heroes

The Counties Manukau Heroes competed in the Lion Red Cup from 1994 to 1996.

Stan Martin coached them in 1994 and 1995 before accepting a contract with the Whitehaven. He was replaced by Cameron Bell for the 1996 season.

Notable players
Notable players included; Duane Mann, Frank Watene, 1995 captain Dean Clark, Whetu Taewa, Clayton Friend, Des Maea, Gus Malietoa-Brown, Solomon Kiri, Jason Temu, Bryan Laumatia, 1994 captain Hitro Okesene and his brother Paul, Esau Mann, Matthew Sturm, Mark Faumuina, Leroy Joe, Richard O'Connell, Te Manawa Loza, Mark Leithbridge. Jerry Seuseu and Willie Wolfgramm.

Season results

2004–2008: Jetz

The Counties Manukau Jetz were a franchise in the Bartercard Cup.

Notable players
New Zealand Warriors who were assigned to the club included: Sonny Fai, Nathan Fien & George Gatis

History
The Jetz entered the competition in 2004 in the place of the Manurewa Marlins. They finished a disappointing seventh and missed out on the playoffs. 2005 however was a better year with the team performing well, losing to eventual winners Mt Albert in the Preliminary Final. In 2006 they again made the playoffs but were eliminated by Tamaki in the first week. Before the 2007 season long serving head coach Gary Kemble announced his retirement to concentrate on business interests so former Northern Storm coach Geoff Morton was appointed for the season. The team's final season was its worst with it coming second to last.

2010: Zone

Following the Sparc review of the New Zealand Rugby League the new zonal competition was launched in 2010. Counties Manukau became a stand-alone zone with a team that was separate from Auckland.

Counties Manukau draws players from Mangere East, Howick, Pakuranga, Papakura, Franklin, Tuakau, Waiuku, Pukekohe, Papatoetoe, Otara, Manukau and Otahuhu.

In the 2010 season, Counties Manukau won the Under 15 and Under 17 tournaments but lost the final of the senior competition, being defeated by Auckland 14 – 6.

References

Rugby league in Counties Manukau
New Zealand rugby league teams
1994 establishments in New Zealand